Deanna Wallace (née Bowers), also known as Dee Wallace Stone, is an American actress. She is perhaps best known for her role as Mary Taylor, the mother in the 1982 blockbuster film E.T. the Extra-Terrestrial. She is also known for her starring roles in several horror films including The Hills Have Eyes (1977), The Howling (1981), Cujo (1983) and Critters (1986).

Early and personal life
Wallace was born in Kansas City, Kansas, the daughter of Maxine (née Nichols) and Robert Stanley Bowers. She attended Wyandotte High School, before attending the University of Kansas and obtaining an education degree. She briefly taught high school drama at Washington High School in her native Kansas City in the early 1970s.

She was briefly married first to Barry Wallace and still uses his last name in her career. Their marriage ended in divorce. She married Christopher Stone in 1980, who died suddenly in 1995. They have one daughter, Gabrielle Stone.

Wallace is a public speaker and self-help author, having written three books, and has her own call-in radio show where she talks exclusively about the creation of "self". She often speaks about how you can get through tough times with determination and love. She has also written a book called Bright Light about her life lessons from an acting career.

In 2018, she gave her first TED talk at TEDx Cape May, entitled "The Common Ground of Self".

Career
Wallace began her career on television appearing in episodes of The Streets of San Francisco, Starsky & Hutch and Police Woman, before appearing in the box-office horror hit film The Hills Have Eyes (1977). In 1981, she played a leading role in the horror film The Howling opposite her husband Christopher Stone. They later starred together in Cujo (1983) based on Stephen King's 1981 novel of the same name.

In 1982, Wallace went on to star in Steven Spielberg's science fiction film E.T. the Extra-Terrestrial (1982). The film became the highest-grossing film of all time—a record held for eleven years until Jurassic Park, another Spielberg-directed film, surpassed it in 1993. Wallace received a Saturn Award nomination for her performance. Wallace also starred in a number of comedy movies, including 10 (1979), Jimmy the Kid (1982) and Secret Admirer (1985). In 1986, she starred in the horror comedy film Critters (a role she later reprised in a sequel, Critters Attack!, in 2019). She has also appeared in many other horror films, most notably Peter Jackson's The Frighteners (1996).

On television, Wallace played a leading role in the CBS sitcom Together We Stand (1986–1987) and the family drama The New Lassie (1989–1992). She guest starred in episodes of a number of shows, including The Twilight Zone, Hotel, Murder, She Wrote, Touched by an Angel, Bones, Grey's Anatomy, My Name Is Earl, Criminal Minds, and The Office. In 2015, Wallace was cast on the ABC soap opera series General Hospital, as Patricia Spencer, the unseen, long-lost older sister of Luke and Bobbie Spencer; Wallace also appeared in the show Supernatural, in the episode titled "Into the Mystic" (01/27/2016).

She was nominated for the Daytime Emmy Award for Outstanding Special Guest Performer in a Drama Series.

Selected filmography

Film

Television

References

External links

American film actresses
American stage actresses
American television actresses
Living people
Actresses from Kansas City, Kansas
University of Kansas alumni
20th-century American actresses
21st-century American actresses
Year of birth missing (living people)